This is a list of premiers of Ontario in order of time served in office as premier of Ontario as of . The preceding premier always stays in office during an election campaign, and that time is included in the total. See also List of Ontario political parties by time in office.

List

 Frank Miller's Progressive Conservative Party won a plurality of seats in the 1985 Ontario general election, but the resulting 33rd Parliament of Ontario passed a motion of no confidence against him less than two months into his mandate, replacing his government with David Peterson's Liberal Party. This table counts the 1985 election as a mandate for Miller.

References

Ontario

Premiers